Glide Memorial Church is a church in San Francisco, California, formerly a United Methodist Church congregation, which opened in 1930. Since the 1960s, it has served as a counter-culture rallying point, as one of the most prominently liberal churches in the United States. Located in the city's Tenderloin neighborhood, an area affected by drug addiction and homelessness, Glide is known for its social service programs, as well as the Glide Ensemble, its Gospel choir.  The church building was listed on the National Register of Historic Places in 2022.

History
In 1929, Methodist philanthropist Lizzie Glide purchased a parcel of land at the intersection of Ellis and Taylor Streets in San Francisco and founded the Glide Foundation as a memorial to her millionaire cattleman husband, H.L. Glide of Sacramento.  Construction of Glide Memorial United Methodist Church was completed two years later. Glide purchased the Hotel Californian two blocks away and it was operated as a temperance hotel for decades. The foundation also built a dormitory for Christian women at U.C. Berkeley and a home for young working Christian women.

In the 1960s, Rev. Cecil Williams "took over a small congregation and opened it to the neighborhood’s poor and disenfranchised — including drug addicts, prostitutes and gay runaways" (as summarized later by the San Francisco Chronicle). In 1964, the Glide church helped form the Council on Religion and the Homosexual in an effort to close the gap between people of faith and the LGBTQ community. The church also replaced traditional hymns with jazz and blues music, and its message of "unconditional love and acceptance" would come to resonate with celebrities including Marvin Gaye, Bono, Maya Angelou and Warren Buffett.

In the 1970s, church leaders and members protested the proposed demolition of the International Hotel. Williams was a prominent supporter of cult leader Jim Jones, and in January 1977 presented him with a humanitarian award. After Jones led his Peoples Temple followers into mass suicide in 1978, Williams expressed regret for having associated with Jones.

In November 2020, Glide separated from the United Methodist Church.  Glide Church remained committed to supporting LGBTQ faith leaders and congregants, while the Methodist church continues to limit their full participation. 

In 2022, the Glide Foundation submitted plans for a $200 million redevelopment to replace its former women’s dormitory at 300 Ellis Street with a new 10-story building, as well as renovate the actual church building right next to it.

On November 10, 2022, the National Labor Relations Board held a union election by secret ballot at Glide Foundation's Ellis St building. 83 percent of Glide workers who participated in the election voted in support of the formation of a union, to be represented by the Office and Professional Employees International Union (OPEIU).

Leadership
Prior to Williams, who took over in 1963, Rev. John Moore, whose sermons on homosexuality appeared on the front page of the San Francisco Chronicle, had been Pastor.

Cecil Williams remained sole pastor until 1999, when Rev. Douglass Fitch was named co-Pastor. In 2000, Rev. Fitch was appointed Pastor upon Williams’ retirement and transition into the role of Glide Foundation’s CEO. Fitch remained Glide’s primary pastor until his 2006 retirement, at which time Williams was succeeded as CEO by Willa Seldon.

The Rev. Dr. Donald F. Guest was appointed senior pastor from 2006-2011, and Rev. Dr. Karen Oliveto joined Glide as his co-pastor in 2008.
In early 2010, Glide announced the resignation of CEO Willa Seldon, who agreed to continue in the position until a replacement was found.

In September 2010, Rita Shimmin and Kristen Growney Yamamoto were appointed Co-Executive Directors of Glide, replacing founding Executive Director Janice Mirikitani. Mirikitani, Williams’ wife, continued in her role as Founding President.

In August 2012, Rev. Theon Johnson III was appointed as Associate Pastor. In June 2014, Rev. Angela Brown JD., was also appointed Associate Pastor. 

Senior Pastor Rev. Karen Oliveto left Glide after being elected bishop in July 2016. Bishop Warner H. Brown, Jr. served as Interim Senior Pastor for the following year.

Co-Executive Director Kristen Growney Yamamoto stepped down on June 30, 2016, when her family relocated to England. By that time, Glide had already begun a nationwide search for candidates to fill a new leadership role, that of Foundation President, which was to come into effect as Rev. Williams and Janice Mirikitani moved into part-time roles.

In August 2017, Karen J. Hanrahan became Glide Foundations' President and Chief Executive Officer, joining a leadership team that includes Executive Director Rita Shimmin, Co-Founders Cecil Williams and Janice Mirikitani, and Lead Pastor Rev. Jay Williams.

Without notice, the United Methodist Church removed all of its pastoral leadership from Glide Church on Father's Day of 2018.  Minister Marvin K. White began preaching as an interim and was ultimately selected to become the Minister of Celebration.  Marvin has authored several books, including Last Rights and Nothin' Ugly Fly, which were finalists for the Lambda Literary Award for Gay Men's Poetry.  Glide Church has a board of directors that oversees its operations.

Programs
Since the 1960s, Glide Church has provided various services for the poor and disenfranchised.  The GLIDE Foundation currently runs 87 various social service programs. Through their Daily Free Meals program, Glide serves three meals daily, amounting to over 750,000 free meals a year.

In 2007, Glide provided 750,000 meals per year through their community clinic, which serves more than 3,000 homeless people. They provided over 100,000 hours of licensed childcare and quality after-school programming to over 325 clients in 2007. They provided emergency supplies to 2,190 individuals in 2006. And they booked 5,707 shelter beds and helped 120 homeless persons move into permanent housing in 2007. As of 2022, Glide was serving 800,000 meals annually.

The church also provides HIV testing, mental and primary health care, women's programs, crisis intervention, an after-school program, creative arts and mentoring for youth, literacy classes, computer training, job skills training, drug and alcohol recovery programs, free legal services for the homeless, and housing with case management.

In 2009, The GLIDE Foundation was rated a Top Non-Profit Organization by Philanthropedia.org

Music

Glide Ensemble
The Glide Ensemble, the church's Gospel Choir, currently maintains about 100 members.  The Glide Ensemble choir held its first rehearsals in 1969 and has been an integral part of Sunday Celebrations ever since.  Directed by John F. Turk Jr. and Ron Sutherland and backed by a full band called the Change Band, the choir groups perform every Sunday at Glide’s 9am and 11am Sunday Celebrations.  Vernon Bush currently  leads the Glide Ensemble, which has teamed up with a host of notable musicians such as Sammy Davis Jr., Leonard Bernstein, Marvin Gaye, Bono, Bobby McFerrin, Maya Angelou, and Joan Baez.

In 2005, SF Weekly named the Glide Ensemble and Change Band “Best Gospel” in their annual “Best Of San Francisco” awards.

Discography

The Glide Ensemble and Change Band have released 9 albums since 1991, which are sold on the first level of the church. All proceeds help fund Glide Foundation’s various social service programs.

John Turk's 30th Anniversary Concert (2010)
The Real Sounds of the Glide Ensemble: Special Edition Anthology [4 CDs]
Wings of Song: A Spiritual Flight (2009)
Holidays with Real Soul (2007)
A Salute to Ron Sutherland (2004)
The Sounds of Hope (2001)
Love to Give (1997)
Coming Home to the Spirit (1994)
Touch the Spirit (1991)

Podcasts of every Sunday celebration are available on Glide’s website.

Youth and Children’s Choirs
Glide Ensemble Member Errin Mixon leads a choir of teens and young adults that rehearses once a week and performs at services once a month.
The Children’s Choir sings during Sunday Celebrations several times a year.

Funding 
In the 1960's Glide helped the Tenderloin become recognized as an Anti-Poverty District  and was able to receive federal funding to support seniors, LGBTQ individuals and the homeless in the area.  

In 1981, Glide began receiving subsidies from the city for its meals program. As of 2002, individual donations from Sunday mass contributed less than $640,000 of the foundation's $8.5 million revenue. Glide also obtains funding from other various fundraising activities such as their Annual Holiday Festival.

From 2000 to 2022, business magnate Warren Buffett raised over $34.2 million for Glide through an annual auction whose winner was invited to have lunch with him.

Notable actions 
Largely through the actions of its long-time Pastor Cecil Williams, Glide became known for its views on issues such as same-sex marriage. Williams’ actions included:
Removing the cross inside the sanctuary at Glide.
Helping form the Council on Religion and Homosexuality in 1964

In popular culture
Glibb Memorial Church in Armistead Maupin's book, Tales of the City is based on Glide.
Glide Memorial Methodist Church was featured prominently in "The Pursuit of Happyness" in 2006.

See also 
 LGBT-affirming churches

References

External links

Churches in San Francisco
Christian organizations established in 1930
1930 establishments in California
National Register of Historic Places in San Francisco